Igor Galynker is an American psychiatrist, clinician and researcher. His diverse interests include bipolar disorder, suicide prevention, and the role of family in psychiatric illness. He has published on these topics both in professional journals and in the lay press. Most recently his research has been devoted to describing a suicide-specific clinical state, a phenotype of the Suicide Crisis Syndrome (SCS).

Galynker is the Associate Chairman for Research in the Department of Psychiatry at Mount Sinai Beth Israel, and is the Founder and Director of the Family Center for Bipolar Disorder and of the Mount Sinai Suicide Research and Prevention Laboratory based at Mount Sinai Beth Israel. As of 2014 he is a Professor of Psychiatry at the Icahn School of Medicine in New York City.

Education and work in chemistry 
Galynker was born in  Moscow, USSR. His mother, Raya, was an internist and his father, Ilya, was a professor of textile engineering. They met and married in Voronezh before World War II and moved to Moscow after the war ended. In 1971 Galynker graduated from Moscow's Public School #109 as valedictorian, and in 1976 he graduated magna cum laude from the Department of Chemistry at Moscow State University.

He immigrated to the United States in 1978, and after working for one year as a chemist researcher at the CIBA-Geigy corporation, he began his graduate studies (1978–1981) in organic synthesis under professor W. Clark Still at Columbia University. His PhD thesis, which earned the Hammet Award for outstanding research, described the first use of computer modeling in organic synthesis and has subsequently been widely cited. After completing a fellowship in human genetics at the Columbia Presbyterian Medical Center, Galynker taught chemistry at Purdue University and at Columbia University.

Work in psychiatry and Mount Sinai Beth Israel 

Galynker received his medical degree in 1988 from the Albert Einstein College of Medicine, where he was elected into the Alpha Omega Alpha honor society, and completed his psychiatry residency at Mount Sinai Medical Center. He has since worked at Beth Israel Medical Center in Manhattan (currently Mount Sinai Beth Israel), where he is the Associate Chairman for Research in the Department of Psychiatry and Behavioral Sciences.

In the Department, Galynker created a residency research program, which requires all psychiatry residents to learn the research process and complete a research project. He also founded and ran the Russian Health Service and is a Patient Experience Physician Advocate at Beth Israel. He was awarded the Patient Experience Excellence Award and has been listed in the America's Top Psychiatrists list as well as in the Top New York Physicians "Superdoctors" list.

Galynker Family Center for Bipolar Disorder 

In 2006, Galynker founded the Family Center for Bipolar (FCB), a clinical and research center treating children, adolescents, and adults. The Center was profiled in the New York Times and the Wall Street Journal. In 2015, the Family Center for Bipolar was officially renamed the Richard and Cynthia Zirinsky Center for Bipolar, in honor of a gift from the Zirinsky Family. In 2021, the Center was renamed the Galynker Family Center for Bipolar Disorder.

Other research

Cognition 

While working as a resident psychiatrist, Galynker was the first to report that both hospital admissions from the ER and the duration of hospital stay in the acute psychiatric unit was influenced by cognition, suggesting that in addition to psychiatric symptoms, cognitive dysfunction should be a target of pharmacological intervention. This work anticipated later focus on treatment of cognitive dysfunction and cognitive training in schizophrenia and bipolar disorder Galynker later reported on persistent cognitive deficits in opiate addicts in methadone maintenance treatment

Addictions 

While in residency working at the Brookhaven National Laboratory, Galynker synthesized [11-C]-buprenorphine for use in PET studies of opiate addiction. He later published PET studies of remitted opiate addicts which showed that cognitive deficits, negative affect, and abnormal glucose metabolism present during active drug use persisted for months and years after detoxification from methadone. With Dr. Lisa Cohen, Galynker later showed that behavioral sex addicts, such as male pedophiles, had deficits in glucose metabolism in the temporal cortex and severe character pathology that was similar but broader and more pronounced than that of the opiate-dependent subjects. In a subsequent series of reports, Cohen and Galynker described character pathology of pedophiles and other sex offenders and proposed a model for the etiology of pedophilic behavior.

Mood disorders 

In 1998 Galynker published a widely cited SPECT study of cerebral perfusion in Major Depressive Disorder (MDD), which showed that in MDD, reduced cerebral blood flow was associated with negative symptoms rather than mood. This was one of the first imaging studies to demonstrate that cerebral function was not related to a specific diagnosis but to symptoms, a finding which echoed Galynker's early findings on cognitive deficits and patient function, and anticipated the current NIMH Research Domain Criteria Project. Galynker was also the first to report (in a case series) that low dose quetiapine and risperidone were effective for treatment of depression and anxiety a finding later supported by randomized clinical trials, leading to quetiapine approval for these indications. Galynker has also contributed to research investigating racial disparities in diagnostic rates of bipolar disorder, finding that Black individuals are more likely than white patients to be diagnosed with schizophrenia rather than bipolar disorder.

Suicide 

Galynker's present research focuses on suicide prevention. In 2010, with Dr. Zimri Yaseen he described a suicide-specific clinical syndrome, the Suicide Crisis Syndrome (SCS), initially known as Suicide Trigger State. This finding was later replicated in three other studies. In high-risk suicidal inpatients, high scores in the Suicide Crisis Inventory (SCI) were strongly predictive of suicidal behavior within one-two months after discharge. The core feature of SCS is the persistent and desperate feeling of entrapment, which is urgency to escape or avoid an unbearable life situation when escape is perceived as impossible (Typical situations would include terminal illness, humiliating failure at work, or rejection by a romantic partner). In addition, the SCS involves affective disturbance, loss of cognitive control, hyperarousal and social withdrawal. Importantly, the staple of current suicide risk assessment, suicidal ideation and intent may or may not be present.

In addition to the SCI, Galynker and colleagues have recently developed a multi-informant Modular Assessment of Risk for Imminent Suicide (MARIS). MARIS has four independent assessment modules and is unique in that both patients and clinicians provide information. Clinicians' modules include their emotional responses to the SCS, which significantly improve predictive scale. Both the SCS and the MARIS projects were funded by the American Foundation for Suicide Prevention. Galynker recently proposed a Narrative-Crisis Model of Suicide, which so far has been supported by the experimental evidence. The SCS, the MARIS, and their clinical use are described in Galynker's recent textbook, "The Suicidal Crisis. Clinical Guide to the Assessment of Imminent Suicide Risk." As of 2021, the Suicide Crisis Syndrome is currently under review for inclusion in the DSM-5 as a suicide-specific diagnosis. The Suicidal Crisis, second edition, will be published in April 2023.

Media and public awareness 

Galynker has been outspoken in his concerns about possible conflicts of interest between psychiatrists and the pharmaceutical industry. In 2005, he showed that the results of pharmaceutical trials published in even the most reputable scientific journals, JAMA Psychiatry and the American Journal of Psychiatry, systematically favored the drug produced by the manufacturer that paid for the study and disfavored the competitor. This study was profiled on the front page of USA Today.

Galynker has also been concerned with the harmful consequences of family exclusion from psychiatric treatment, which he associated with an increased risk of violence and suicide as well as poor outcomes His opinions on the role of family (and staff) in preventing campus violence and reducing student suicide risks have been published by ABC News,  the New York Times, and The Wall Street Journal. Galynker has written an acclaimed book,  Talking to Families About Mental Illness, on how to involve family in psychiatric treatment, as well as an advice book on how to recognize the right romantic partner, "Choosing Right: A Psychiatrist's Guide to Starting a New Relationship".

Galynker uses media appearances to educate the public about mental illness and mental health, aiming to reduce and ultimately eliminate the stigma of mental illness. His opinions on many topics related to mental illness and mental health have been cited by abcnews.com, aolhealth.com, The Associated Press, cnn.com, The Daily News, gawker.com, Le Generaliste, health.com, JAMA, lifescript.com, The New York Times, Newsday, PrimaryCareClinician.com, Psychiatric Times, Psychopharmacology Update, wired.com, and The Wall Street Journal.

Recently, Galynker has been making media appearances discussing the importance of his model for the Suicidal Crisis Syndrome and what insight it can offer clinicians and patients insofar as imminent suicide risk. He has been interviewed by psychological blogs and appeared on multiple podcasts, including APA publications and MDEdge. In 2021, the American Foundation for Suicide Prevention published a spotlight interview piece with Galynker, in which he discusses his career in suicide research and prevention

References 

American addiction physicians
Psychopharmacologists
Suicidologists
Date of birth missing (living people)
Living people
Year of birth missing (living people)